List of Norwegian estates contains former and present bigger gatherings of land in Norway of the Crown, of the Church, of the noble estate, and of commoners. See also the list of Norway's biggest landowners.

Northern Norway 

Counties: Finnmark, Nordland, Troms.

Central Norway 
Counties: Nord-Trøndelag, Sør-Trøndelag.

Western Norway 
Counties: Hordaland, Møre og Romsdal, Rogaland, Sogn og Fjordane.

Southern Norway 
Counties: Aust-Agder, Vest-Agder.

Eastern Norway
Counties: Akershus, Buskerud, Hedmark, Oppland, Oslo, Telemark, Vestfold, Østfold.

Crown Estate 
 Norwegian crown estate
 Finnmark Estate

Church Estate 
 Norwegian church estate

See also 
List of the largest landowners of Norway

References 

Estates